Seán Fitzpatrick (born 1951) is an Irish former hurler. At club level he played with Carrick Swans and was also a member of the Tipperary senior hurling team.

Career

Fitzpatrick first played hurling at juvenile and underage levels with Carrick Swans. He won several divisional titles in the minor and under-21 grades, before winning a Tipperary U21AHC title in 1972. By this stage Fitzpatrick had joined the Carrick senior team and won six South Tipperary SHC medals between 1974 and 1986.

Fitzpatrick never played at minor level for Tipperary, however, his club performances earned a call-up to the under-21 team that won the Munster U21HC title in 1972. He was also a member of the intermediate team that year and lined out at left corner-back 1972 All-Ireland intermediate final defeat of Galway. Fitzpatrick was a member of the senior team's extended panel in 1977 and 1982.

Honours

Carrick Swans
South Tipperary Senior Hurling Championship: 1974, 1978, 1983, 1984, 1985, 1986
Tipperary Under-21 A Hurling Championship: 1972
South Tipperary Under-21 A Hurling Championship: 1971, 1972
South Tipperary Senior Hurling Championship: 1969

Tipperary
All-Ireland Intermediate Hurling Championship: 1972
Munster Intermediate Hurling Championship: 1972
Munster Under-21 Hurling Championship: 1972

References

External link

 Seán Fitzpatrick player profile

1951 births
Living people
Carrick Swans hurlers
Tipperary inter-county hurlers